Marc Canham is a British composer of music for film and video games. In 2008, he scored Far Cry 2, and in 2020, he composed the film score to I Care A Lot,  for which he received an ASCAP award. Canham has collaborated with several artists including Iggy Pop, Nathan Johnson, Philip Glass, Baaba Maal, Bryan Mantia, and Paul Hartnoll.

On creating music, Canham stated that he wanted to deliver emotion through a "sound palette" of combinations of sounds, textures, and ensembles of instruments, then letting loose with melodies and motifs.   For I Care A Lot, Canham claims to have created the score from the script, as opposed to the film.

Nimrod Productions
Along with Richard Aitken and others, Canham founded Nimrod Productions Limited in 2000, a music production company in Oxfordshire, UK.  Nimrod has provided orchestral soundtracks for The Getaway, Black Monday, Gran Turismo 4 and Driver versions 2  and 3. It was dissolved in 2019.

Nimrod Studio Orchestra
Canham founded the Nimrod Studio Orchestra (NSO) in 2002, a commercial session orchestra which has been behind game scores including 24: The Game, Killzone 2, and Act of War: Direct Action.

Works

Film scores

Games

Installations
The Dagger Tree, Titanic Museum, Belfast.

References 

Living people
1977 births